Albertville is a city in Marshall County, Alabama, United States, and is included in the Huntsville-Decatur Combined Statistical Area. As of the 2020 census, the population of the city was 22,386. It is the largest city in Marshall County.

History
The area which today includes Albertville was inhabited by the indigenous Cherokee, until their removal to Oklahoma in the 1830s. It was near the territory of the Creek nation, and several major trails which afforded communication (or military action) between the two nations crossed the area. It is believed to have been crossed by Spanish explorer Hernando de Soto during his expeditions in 1540.

During the American Civil War, the area around Albertville was the scene of several mid-level clashes between Union and Confederate forces.

The first non-indigenous settlement in what is today Albertville began in the 1850s. It was named for Thomas A. Albert, an early settler who moved from Georgia and was a town leader until his death in 1876. The city was incorporated in 1891. A post office was established in 1910.

At about 4:10 p.m. on April 24, 1908, the city was virtually wiped out by a tornado that became commonly called "The Great Cyclone", or "The Cyclone of 1908". The storm is believed to have killed 35 people across northeastern Alabama, including 15 in Albertville. Relief was largely delivered by railroad, particularly from the nearby city of Gadsden. Trains from Gadsden transported doctors, nurses, and the Queen City Guards, the Alabama militia company based in Gadsden. The commander of the latter, future Gadsden mayor and Col. R.A. Mitchell, reported in a dispatch to Governor B.B. Comer:

 ... The destruction of property here is, I think, unprecedented in the history of the state. I have never seen anything like it, so complete and absolute as to leave little of worth in the path of the storm through town. On viewing the wreckage, covering easily forty acres or more in the heart of town, it appears incredible that any living being could have escaped the fury of the storm and death ...

In 1893, the Alabama Legislature passed an act for the erection of an agricultural college in each of the state's congressional districts. After some competition, Albertville was awarded the school for the Seventh District. This is the school that evolved into today's Albertville High School, whose sports teams are still known as the "Aggies".

In 1910, Albertville had a population of 1,544, becoming the largest community in Marshall County.

Before the New Deal, when the Tennessee Valley Authority built Guntersville Dam, flooding on the Tennessee River would frequently leave the county courthouse in Guntersville inaccessible for residents of Albertville and other areas atop Sand Mountain. In 1919, the Alabama Legislature responded by requiring the erection of a courthouse at Albertville, in which cases arising in that part of the county would be heard.

In 1950, Albertville had a population of 5,397, and reclaimed the title (from Guntersville) of the largest city in the county, and has held the distinction ever since.

On June 1, 2009, the city council voted to establish English as the town's official language.

On April 24, 2010, an EF-3 tornado ripped through downtown Albertville. The storm resulted in no deaths. The high school was severely damaged, nearly every home had some type of damage, and many were destroyed beyond repair.

Geography
Albertville is located in southeastern Marshall County at  (34.265362, -86.211261). It is bordered to the southeast by the city of Boaz and to the northwest by the city of Guntersville.

The Tennessee Valley Divide passes through the southern part of the city. The majority of the city drains north to Short Creek, a tributary of the Tennessee River, while the southern part drains to Slab Creek, a west-flowing tributary of the Locust Fork of the Black Warrior River. The current slogan of Albertville is "The Heart of Sand Mountain", which can be seen on the welcome sign coming into the city.

Climate

Demographics

City of Albertville

Albertville first appeared as an incorporated town on the 1910 U.S. Census. It was also the same name as its precinct/census division, which preceded it in reporting on the census since 1880 (See Albertville Precinct below).

2000 Census data
At the 2000 census, there were 17,247 people in 6,566 households, including 4,615 families, in the city. The racial makeup of the city was 86.15% White, 2.05% Black or African American, 0.31% Native American, 0.26% Asian, 0.10% Pacific Islander, 9.78% from other races, and 1.35% from two or more races. 16.08% of the population are Hispanic or Latino. By 2007, the Hispanic population was estimated at 25%.

In 2000 Of the 6,566 households 32.7% had children under the age of 18 living with them, 54.0% were married couples living together, 11.9% had a female householder with no husband present, and 29.7% were non-families. 25.9% of households were one person and 12.2% were one person aged 65 or older. The average household size was 2.59 and the average family size was 3.08.

The age distribution was 26.0% under the age of 18, 10.1% from 18 to 24, 28.7% from 25 to 44, 20.7% from 45 to 64, and 14.5% 65 or older. The median age was 34 years. For every 100 females, there were 93.1 males. For every 100 females age 18 and over, there were 89.9 males.

The median household income was $31,893 and the median family income  was $38,508. Males had a median income of $30,076 versus $20,275 for females. The per capita income for the city was $16,336. About 14.1% of families and 16.7% of the population were below the poverty line, including 21.8% of those under age 18 and 21.0% of those age 65 or over.

2010 census
At the 2010 census, there were 21,160 people in 7,497 households, including 5,270 families, in the city. The racial makeup of the city was 75.9% White, 1.9% Black or African American, 0.8% Native American, 0.5% Asian, 0.1% Pacific Islander, 18.7% from other races, and 2.1% from two or more races. 27.9% of the population are Hispanic or Latino.

In 2010, of the 7,497 households 34.6% had children under the age of 18 living with them, 50.5% were married couples living together, 14.2% had a female householder with no husband present, and 29.7% were non-families. 24.6% of households were one person and 11.9% were one person aged 65 or older. The average household size was 2.79 and the average family size was 3.27.

The age distribution was 28.2% under the age of 18, 10.2% from 18 to 24, 28.4% from 25 to 44, 20.7% from 45 to 64, and 12.5% 65 or older. The median age was 32.3 years. For every 100 females, there were 97.2 males. For every 100 females age 18 and over, there were 104.2 males.

The median household income was $35,843 and the median family income was $41,862. Males had a median income of $30,164 versus $25,700 for females. The per capita income for the city was $16,839. About 15.8% of families and 23.6% of the population were below the poverty line, including 35.6% of those under age 18 and 7.6% of those age 65 or over.

2020 census

As of the 2020 United States census, there were 22,386 people, 7,249 households, and 5,099 families residing in the city.

Albertville Precinct/Division (1880-1970); Albertville-Boaz Division (1980-)

Albertville, the 4th Beat/Precinct of Marshall County, first appeared on the 1880 U.S. Census. In 1960, Albertville precinct was changed to census division as part of a general reorganization of counties. In 1980, Albertville and Boaz Census Divisions were merged to become the Albertville-Boaz Census Division.

Education
Public schools are overseen by Albertville City Schools.  There are six schools in the city:
 Albertville Kindergarten and Pre-K - Kindergarten
 Albertville Primary School- 1st and 2nd grades
 Albertville Elementary School- 3rd and 4th grades
 Albertville Intermediate School - 5th and 6th grades
 Albertville Middle School- 7th and 8th grades
Albertville High School - 9th through 12th grades

Healthcare
 Marshall Medical Center South, a 150-bed facility, serves the region.

Industry
Albertville is home to the Mueller Company, which produces fire hydrants, thus Albertville holds the title of "Fire Hydrant Capital of the World."  To commemorate the one millionth fire hydrant, a chrome fire hydrant was placed outside the Albertville Chamber of Commerce.

Albertville is also home to poultry plants operated by Wayne Farms, Pilgrim's Pride, and Tyson Foods.

Mitchell Grocery Corporation, located in Albertville, is a wholesale grocery distribution center serving more than 200 independent supermarkets in the Southeast.

In April 2012, Newman Technology, broke ground on an auto parts manufacturing facility in Albertville. This plant will build component parts for Honda, Acura and Subaru and was expected to begin operating in early 2013. Newman was established in 1987 and is a wholly owned subsidiary of Sankei Giken Kogyo Co. of Japan. It is a supplier of fabricated and value-added assemblies to the automotive and recreational vehicle markets with facilities current in Mansfield, Ohio, and Aiken, S.C.

Popular culture
When the 1992 Winter Olympics were held in Albertville, France, the citizens of its heteronymic counterpart in Alabama took full advantage of the opportunity to put their town on display. Mock winter games were held in this subtropical city, and one New Orleans radio station offered listeners a chance to win a trip to "the Albertville games" in Alabama.

In 2008, Albertville was featured in an episode in the fifth season of the A&E television documentary series Intervention titled "Meth Mountain". Among the featured Albertville residents was Dr. Mary Holley, an obstetrician whose methamphetamine-addicted brother committed suicide, and who founded the anti-methamphetamine group "Mothers Against Methamphetamine".

Albertville was featured in two episodes of the radio show and podcast This American Life. The episodes focused on the influx of Latino immigrants in the town's chicken plants and the impact this had on the community.

Transportation
 U.S. Highway 431
 Alabama Highway 75
 Alabama State Route 205
Thomas J. Brumlik Field (Albertville Regional Airport)
Alabama and Tennessee River Railway

Notable people

Edward Earl Carnes, judge, United States Court of Appeals for the Eleventh Circuit
Rusty Greer, professional baseball player with the Texas Rangers
Charley Hannah, former professional football offensive guard and defensive end
John Hannah, professional football offensive lineman; elected to the Pro Football Hall of Fame
Glenn Hearn, former mayor of Huntsville, Alabama, FBI Special Agent, Alabama State Legislator
Angela Little, model, actress, and Playboy Playmate of the Month
Ola L. Mize, United States Army officer and recipient of the Medal of Honor for his actions in the Korean War
Charley Pell, former head football coach at Clemson University and the University of Florida
Susan Story, utility executive
Bobby Thomason, first professional football quarterback to throw for over 400 yards in a single game

Gallery

References

Notes

References

External links

Albertville Chamber of Commerce
Marshall County Economic Development Council
Marshall County Tourism & Sports

Populated places established in 1891
Cities in Alabama
Cities in Marshall County, Alabama
Huntsville-Decatur, AL Combined Statistical Area
1891 establishments in Alabama